Phoneyusa is a genus of spiders belonging to the family Theraphosidae (tarantulas).

Taxonomy
The genus was erected by Ferdinand Karsch in 1884, based on a spider from central Africa he regarded as in some ways similar to the South American genera Avicularia and Eurypelma (now included in Avicularia), but nevertheless distinct. Karsch explained the name as meaning "murderess". (Phoneyusa is one transcription of the Greek , derived from the verb , 'murder'.)

Distribution
The species of this genus are found in sub-Saharan Africa.

Species 
, the World Spider Catalog accepted the following species:

Phoneyusa antilope (Simon, 1889) – Congo
Phoneyusa belandana Karsch, 1884 (type species) – Central African Rep.
Phoneyusa bidentata Pocock, 1899 – West, Central Africa
Phoneyusa bouvieri Berland, 1917 – Madagascar
Phoneyusa buettneri Karsch, 1886 – Gabon
Phoneyusa chevalieri Simon, 1906 – West Africa
Phoneyusa cultridens Berland, 1917 – Congo
Phoneyusa gabonica (Simon, 1889) – Gabon
Phoneyusa giltayi Laurent, 1946 – Congo
Phoneyusa gracilipes (Simon, 1889) – Congo
Phoneyusa lesserti Dresco, 1973 – Central African Rep.
Phoneyusa manicata Simon, 1907 – Príncipe
Phoneyusa minima (Strand, 1907) – Cameroon
Phoneyusa principium Simon, 1907 – Príncipe
Phoneyusa rutilata (Simon, 1907) – Guinea-Bissau
Phoneyusa westi Smith, 1990 – Angola

References

Theraphosidae
Theraphosidae genera
Spiders of Africa
Taxa named by Ferdinand Karsch